Baggetorp is a bimunicipal locality situated in Katrineholm Municipality and Vingåker Municipality in Södermanland County, Sweden with 502 inhabitants in 2010.

References 

Populated places in Södermanland County
Populated places in Katrineholm Municipality
Populated places in Vingåker Municipality